Adam Loftus Armstrong (13 April 1878 – 30 January 1959) was a New Zealand rugby union player. A wing-forward, Armstrong represented Wairarapa at a provincial level, and was a member of the New Zealand national side, the All Blacks, in 1903. He played five matches for the All Blacks but did not appear in any internationals. After retiring as a player, Armstrong went on to referee to provincial level.

Following the death of Donald Watson in 1958, Armstrong was the oldest living All Black.

References

1878 births
1959 deaths
People from Carterton, New Zealand
New Zealand rugby union players
New Zealand international rugby union players
Rugby union wing-forwards
Wairarapa rugby union players
New Zealand rugby union referees